Longrun is an unincorporated community in western Ozark County, Missouri, United States. Longrun's post office closed and mail delivery is now served by Theodosia.

Longrun was established in 1898 with a post office and school in Longrun Township near Longrun Creek. The post office was discontinued in 1980.

References

Unincorporated communities in Ozark County, Missouri
Unincorporated communities in Missouri